Sierniki may refer to the following places:
Sierniki, Kościan County in Greater Poland Voivodeship (west-central Poland)
Sierniki, Oborniki County in Greater Poland Voivodeship (west-central Poland)
Sierniki, Kuyavian-Pomeranian Voivodeship (north-central Poland)